The 1976 Cal State Fullerton Titans football team represented California State University, Fullerton as a member of the Pacific Coast Athletic Association (PCAA) during the 1976 NCAA Division I football season. Led by second-year head coach Jim Colletto, Cal State Fullerton compiled an overall record 3–7–1 with a mark of 1–3 in conference play, placing fourth in the PCAA. The Titans played home games at Falcon Stadium on the campus of Cerritos College in Norwalk, California.

Schedule

Team players in the NFL
The following Cal State Fullerton players were selected in the 1977 NFL Draft.

References

Cal State Fullerton
Cal State Fullerton Titans football seasons
Cal State Fullerton Titans football